The Indiana Aviation Museum was an aviation museum located in Valparaiso, Indiana, at the Porter County Regional Airport. Incorporated on September 28, 2000, the museum was permanently closed October 29, 2010. The museum was open from May through October, and featured displays of working military and civilian airplanes.

Exhibits

The museum's aircraft were donated by James Read, the founder and president of the museum. The collection began with the T-34 Mentor which required restoration. Interest expanded with the purchase of a P-51 Mustang, PT-17 Stearman, T-28 Trojan, Cessna A-37A, and the AT-6G Texan. Additional civilian aircraft were added to the museum, including a Lake L-4 amphibian and an RV homebuilt.

Inventory
 1941 PT-17 Stearman - Two-seat World War II trainer painted in Army Air Corps colors. Officially  the Boeing Model 75, it was commonly called the "Stearman".  This Stearman was sent to the USAAF on July 30, 1941, and assigned to the 52nd Flying Training Detachment, in Albany, Georgia.
  1945 P-51D Mustang - The museum's P-51D served with the North Dakota, Alabama, and Kentucky Air National Guards before being declared surplus in 1958.
  1952 AT-6G Texan - two-seat advanced trainer, the Naval version was called the SNJ and incorporated a tail hook for cable-arrested carrier landings. The museum's AT-6 was delivered to the USAF on June 11, 1952, to the 3301st Pilot Training Squadron, Columbus AFB, MS.
  1953 DHC 1 MK22 Chipmunk
  1955 T-28B Trojan - The T-28B was assigned to the Navy trainer and also as a photo plane by the U.S. Army. This two seat advanced trainer replaced the World War II AT-6 trainer. Production started in 1950.
  1957 T-34B Mentor
  1943 L-2 Grasshopper
  1967 A-37A Dragonfly
  1991 Van's Aircraft RV-4

Engines
  R-2800 Double Wasp

Closure
The museum closed its doors Oct. 29, 2010 after ten years.  Owners Jim and Cathy Read said it was time to pass the preservation of these aircraft to a younger generation.

References

External links

Buildings and structures in Valparaiso, Indiana
Museums in Porter County, Indiana
Northwest Indiana
Aerospace museums in Indiana
Defunct museums in Indiana